Tamara Isabel Leonelli Leonelli (born 5 June 1997) is a Chilean para table tennis player who competes in international level events. She was the first Chilean table tennis player to win gold at the Parapan American Games and is the first Chilean female table tennis player to qualify to compete at the 2020 Summer Paralympics after winning the gold medal in the women's singles at the 2019 Parapan American Games.

References

1997 births
Living people
People from Temuco
Sportspeople from Santiago
Paralympic table tennis players of Chile
Medalists at the 2015 Parapan American Games
Medalists at the 2019 Parapan American Games
Table tennis players at the 2020 Summer Paralympics
Chilean female table tennis players
21st-century Chilean women